Rockin' on Heaven's Door (lit. "Passionate Goodbye") is a 2013 South Korean film directed by Nam Taek-soo, starring F.T. Island lead vocalist Lee Hong-ki as an idol star who learns to cope with his past and rediscovers music during community work at a hospice for terminally ill patients.

Plot
Chung-ui is a famous Korean pop star with a temper. After he beats up a man at a night club, he is sentenced to do community service at a hospice for terminally ill patients. The reluctant young man first hates his chores and dislikes the people around him, but as he gets to know their stories, he becomes attached to them. The hospice struggles with funding, leading to a possible close-down, so the hospice in-house band, The Phoenix Band decides to apply to a talent show on television. For this, they need an original song, so they ask Chung-ui to help them. The singer refuses at first, then tries to use the opportunity to reduce his sentence days. He ends up seriously changing his mind about music, his behavior and grows to accept his mother's death, while helping the patients achieve their dreams. Even after the death of the band members, he continues to revive The Phoenix Band each time, assisting new patients.

Cast
Lee Hong-gi as Chung-ui 
Baek Jin-hee as Anna
Ma Dong-seok as Mu-seong
Im Won-hee as Bong-shik
Jeon Min-seo as Ha-eun
Shim Yi-young as Power Mom
Lee Min-ah as Ha-eun's mother
Jeon Soo-kyung as Hospice director nun
Choi Kwon as Gwang-sam 
No Kang-min as Him-chan 
Bae Ho-geun as Cheol-soo 
Lee Jae-goo as Chung-ui's father 
Kwak Ja-hyeong as Ha-eun's father 
Jeong Joo-ri as Nurse Jeong
Kim Yoo-in as Nurse Kim
Kim Kwang-hyeon as producer in preliminary exhibition room 
Kim Hyeon-ah as Chung-ui's mother 
Yoo Chang-sook as Young-sik's dying mother
Cha Jong-ho as Young-sik 
Shin An-jin as creditor 1 
Baek Ik-nam as creditor 2 
Kim Soo-bok as bathing grandfather 
Hyeon Seong as agency boss 
Yoo Jae-myung as intensive care unit doctor

Soundtrack

Release
Rockin' on Heaven's Door was released in South Korea on May 30, 2013.

Prior to its domestic release, the film was also sold to Japan, Hong Kong, Singapore, Malaysia, Brunei, and Indonesia. It opened in Japan (with the title Phoenix, Song of Promise) on June 7, 2013, and Singapore on August 22, 2013.

References

External links
 

2010s musical drama films
Films about music and musicians
Films about death
South Korean musical drama films
2010s South Korean films
2010s Korean-language films